Coiled-coil and C2 domain-containing protein 1A is a protein that in humans is encoded by the CC2D1A gene.

References

External links

Further reading